203 (Welsh) Field Hospital is a unit of the Royal Army Medical Corps within the Army Reserve of the British Army, based in Wales.

History
The hospital was formed upon the formation of the TAVR in 1967, from the amalgamation of 3rd (Western) General Hospital, and 158th (Welsh) Field Ambulance, as the 203 (Welsh) General Hospital. Throughout the Cold War, the hospital was under the command of 160th (Welsh) Infantry Brigade; and on transfer to war, would re-subordinate to Commander Medical 1 (BR) Corps, providing 800 beds. During the reforms implemented after the Cold War, the hospital was re-designated as 203 (Welsh) Field Hospital. As a consequence of Army 2020, the unit now falls under 2nd Medical Brigade, and is paired with 33 Field Hospital.

Under the Future Soldier programme, the hospital will be renamed as the 203rd (Welsh) Multi-Role Medical Regiment and fall under 2nd Medical Group.

Current structure
The hospital's structure is as follows:
Headquarters, at Cardiff
A Detachment, at Swansea
B Detachment, at Cardiff and Cwrt y Gollen
C Detachment, at Bodelwyddan and Wrexham

Freedoms
The regiment has received the freedom of several locations throughout its history; these include:

  19 September 2009: Llandudno.  
  17 April 2010: Vale of Glamorgan.

References

Military units and formations established in 1967
Units of the Royal Army Medical Corps